"Conservative Republicans" was a designation applied in reference to a faction of the early Republican Party during the American Civil War and Reconstruction era which advocated a lenient, conciliatory policy towards the South in contrast to the harsher attitudes emphasized by Radical Republicans. "Conservatives" such as Pennsylvania senator Edgar Cowan generally opposed efforts by Radical Republicans to rebuild the Southern U.S. under an economically mobile, free-market system. Although the term usage implies the faction was ideologically conservative, its usage is relative to the Radicals, as many members were considerably more liberal in voting record by party standards, and they supported the moderate Liberal Republican Party in the 1872 United States presidential election. The term "conservative" was adopted in an ad-hoc fashion according to a rudimentary definition of the word, as the term was not used to necessarily describe the faction's overall ideology but was used to particularly describe the faction's position regarding the specific slate of issues directly connected to the Civil War, race, and Reconstruction.

Members of the faction primarily thrived politically on antipathy towards civil rights and black suffrage. In states outside New England, Republicans such as Thurlow Weed, Oliver P. Morton, Jacob Dolson Cox, and James R. Doolittle touted their alliance with President Andrew Johnson and/or exploited racist opposition towards suffrage for political gains and to drastically reduce influence by Radical Republicans. Others in the faction included William H. Seward and Henry J. Raymond. In such states, amendments and referendums to enfranchise blacks would fail due to small fractions of Republican voters voting with Democrats to defeat them. Both Radicals and Conservatives in the Republican Party were firm and unwavering in their viewpoints. Senator William E. Chandler of New Hampshire observed: "I notice, that everyone who goes South, whether Radical or Conservative, comes back confirmed in his previous opinion."

See also
Moderate Republicans (Reconstruction era)

References

Sources

 

Factions in the Republican Party (United States)